is a passenger railway station located in the city of Yamato, Kanagawa, Japan. It is operated by the private railway operator Tokyu Corporation.

Lines

Station layout
Tsukimino Station  has two opposed elevated side platforms serving two tracks. The platforms are connected to the station building by a footbridge.

Platforms

From 11 October 2013, an experimental platform edge door system was installed for evaluation purposes on the down (Chūō-Rinkan-bound) platform. Originally scheduled to be introduced in the summer of 2013, the low-cost system developed by The Nippon Signal Co., Ltd. consists of 10-m long wire rope screens that are raised and lowered, and is installed along the entire 200 m length of the down platform.

History
Tsukimino Station opened on October 15, 1976.

Passenger statistics
In fiscal 2019, the station was used by an average of 10,537 passengers daily.

The passenger figures for previous years are as shown below.

Surrounding area
 Japan National Route 16

See also
 List of railway stations in Japan

References

External links

Tokyu station information 
Platform edge barrier in operation (video)

Railway stations in Kanagawa Prefecture
Railway stations in Japan opened in 1976
Railway stations in Yamato, Kanagawa